Calcium pyrophosphate (Ca2P2O7) is a chemical compound, an insoluble calcium salt containing the pyrophosphate anion. There are a number of forms reported: an anhydrous form, a dihydrate, Ca2P2O7·2H2O and a tetrahydrate, Ca2P2O7·4H2O. Deposition of dihydrate crystals in cartilage are responsible for the severe joint pain in cases of calcium pyrophosphate deposition disease (pseudo gout) whose symptoms are similar to those of gout. Ca2P2O7 is commonly used as a mild abrasive agent in toothpastes, because of its insolubility and nonreactivity toward fluoride.


Preparation
Crystals of the tetrahydrate can be prepared by reacting sodium pyrophosphate, Na4P2O7 with calcium nitrate, Ca(NO3)2, at carefully controlled pH and temperature:
Na4P2O7(aq)+2 Ca(NO3)2(aq)→ Ca2P2O7·4 H2O + 4 NaNO3

The dihydrate, sometimes termed CPPD, can be formed by the reaction of pyrophosphoric acid with calcium chloride:
CaCl2 + H4P2O7(aq) → Ca2P2O7·2 H2O + HCl.

The anhydrous forms can be prepared by heating dicalcium phosphate:
2 CaHPO4 → Ca2P2O7 + H2O
At  240-500 °C an amorphous phase is formed, heating to 750 °C forms β-Ca2P2O7, heating to 1140 - 1350 °C forms the α-Ca2P2O7.

Structure of anhydrous and hydrated forms
The stable tetrahydrate was originally reported to be rhombohedral but is now believed to be monoclinic. Additionally there is an unstable monoclinic form.

The dihydrate is triclinic, with hydrogen bonding between the two water molecules and hydrogen bonds to the O atoms on the anion. An hexagonal dihydrate has also been reported.

The anhydrous form has 3 polymorphs, α-, β-, and metastable γ (Tα/β=1140ºС). The high temperature form α- is monoclinic (P21/n, a=12.66(1)Å, b=8.542(8)Å, c=5.315(5)Å, Z=4, ρα=2.95 g/cm3), with 8 coordinate calcium, the lower temperature form β- is tetragonal (P41, a=b=6.684Å, c=24.144Å, V=915.40Å3, Z=8, ρβ=3.128 g/cm3), with calcium in four different coordination environments, 2 that are 7 coordinate, one eight and one 9. In both the pyrophosphates are essentially eclipsed.

References

Calcium compounds
Pyrophosphates
Phosphates

ja:ピロリン酸カルシウム